Romagnano al Monte is a village and comune of the province of Salerno in the Campania region of southern Italy.

History
The village was destroyed in the Irpinia earthquake of 1980 and rebuilt a few kilometers away. The ghost town became a tourist attraction in the early 2000s  almost like the other one in the province: Roscigno Vecchia. The current baron of the small town is Francesco Torella di Romagnano who now resides in England.

Geography
Romagnano is situated in the northern side of the cilentan geographical region, at the borders of Campania with Basilicata. The new town lies in the localities of Ariola (mainly) and Palazzo.

References

External links

Municipal site of Romagnano al Monte 

Cities and towns in Campania
Localities of Cilento
Ghost towns in Italy